Austin Kleon (born June 16, 1983) is a New York Times bestselling author of five books: Steal Like an Artist; Show Your Work!; Keep Going; Steal Like An Artist Journal; and Newspaper Blackout.

Kleon's works focus on creativity in today's world. He has spoken at organizations such as Pixar, Google, and TEDx, and at conferences such as The Economist's Human Potential Summit and SXSW.

Early life 
On June 16, 1983, Kleon was born in Circleville, Ohio, United States. Kleon's father was an associate professor at Ohio State University. Kleon's mother was a school counsellor and later a school principal. Kleon has two half brothers and a step sister. Kleon graduated as a valedictorian in high school.

Education 
Kleon attended Miami University in Ohio.

Career 
Kleon started his career in a public library in Cleveland, Ohio. While working in a library, Kleon became a blogger and posted his poems. Kleon also taught library users how to use computers. Kleon taught himself HTML and CSS.
In Austin, Texas, Kleon became a web designer for the law school at University of Texas.
Kleon published his poems as Newspaper Blackout.
After Kleon's first book was published, he became a copywriter for Spring box, a digital ad agency.

Kleon's work has been translated into over a dozen languages and featured on major media.

Kleon publishes a weekly newsletter to 70,000+ subscribers.

Personal life 
Kleon lives in Austin, Texas with his family.

Bibliography
 Newspaper Blackout (2010)
 Steal Like An Artist (2012)
 Show Your Work! (2014)
 The Steal Like An Artist Journal (2015)
 Keep Going (2019)

References

External links

 
 Austin Kleon's official Facebook 
 Austin Kleon's official Twitter
 Austin Kleon on NPR

Living people
American bloggers
Place of birth missing (living people)
1983 births

Random stuff